The Leptosphaeriaceae are a family of fungi in the order Pleosporales. The family was circumscribed by mycologist Margaret E. Barr in 1987. According to the Dictionary of the Fungi (10th edition, 2008), the family contains 8 genera and 302 species. The family has a widespread distribution, but is especially prevalent in temperate regions. Species are either saprobic or grow as nectrotrophs on the stems or leaves of plants.

Genera
Coniothyrium 
Didymolepta 
Leptosphaeria 
Mycotodea 
Ophiobolus 
Parahendersonia 
Plenodomus 
Pleoseptum

References

External links

Pleosporales
Dothideomycetes families
Taxa named by Margaret Elizabeth Barr-Bigelow
Taxa described in 1987